Jiangjiehe Bridge is a concrete arch bridge in Weng'an County, Guizhou, China, spanning 330 metres over the Wu River. At 256 metres high the Jiangjiehe Bridge was the highest bridge in China from 1995 when it opened until 2001 when the 297-metre-high Liuguanghe Bridge was completed. , it is among the forty highest bridges in the world. The bridge is located on the provincial S205 road between Weng'an and Honghuagang.

Goupitan Reservoir
The completion of the Goupitan Dam situated 40 km down the river from the bridge site has created a reservoir which extends under the bridge. The true 256 metre drop to the valley floor can now not be seen due to approximately 100 metres of water below the bridge.

See also
List of highest bridges in the world
List of longest arch bridge spans

References
http://wenku.baidu.com/view/e098d384bceb19e8b8f6ba54.html

External links
http://highestbridges.com/wiki/index.php?title=Jiangjiehe_Bridge
http://en.structurae.de/structures/data/index.cfm?ID=s0001929

Bridges in Guizhou
Bridges completed in 1995